
Ryal or Ryals may refer to:

Places
 Ryal, Northumberland, England

Currency
 Rose Ryal, an English gold coin equal to 30 shillings
 Spur ryal, an English gold coin equal to 15 shillings
 Zanzibari ryal, the currency of Zanzibar between 1882 and 1908

People
 Mark Ryal (born 1960), an American baseball player
 Rusty Ryal (born 1983), an American baseball player

Sports brand 

 Ryal, handmade Italian football boots

See also 

Ryall (disambiguation)